The first season of the American television series The Gifted is based on Marvel Comics' X-Men properties, and follows ordinary parents who take their family on the run after they discover their children's mutant abilities. The season is connected to the X-Men film series, set in an alternate timeline where the X-Men have disappeared. It was produced by 20th Century Fox Television in association with Marvel Television, with Matt Nix serving as showrunner.

Stephen Moyer and Amy Acker star as the parents, alongside Sean Teale, Natalie Alyn Lind, Percy Hynes White, Coby Bell, Jamie Chung, Blair Redford, and Emma Dumont. The show was ordered to series in May 2017, after a pilot was filmed in Dallas, Texas. Production on the rest of the season moved to Atlanta, Georgia, where the focus was on creating a grounded take on refugees. The season also deals with ideas of discrimination, and how the actions of some can become more extreme than others.

The season aired from October 2, 2017, to January 15, 2018, over 13 episodes. It received mostly positive reviews from critics, particularly for its social commentary and cast. The Gifted was renewed for a second season on January 4, 2018.

Episodes

Cast and characters

Main
 Stephen Moyer as Reed Strucker
 Amy Acker as Caitlin Strucker
 Sean Teale as Marcos Diaz / Eclipse
 Natalie Alyn Lind as Lauren Strucker
 Percy Hynes White as Andy Strucker
 Coby Bell as Jace Turner
 Jamie Chung as Clarice Fong / Blink
 Blair Redford as John Proudstar / Thunderbird
 Emma Dumont as Lorna Dane / Polaris

Recurring
 Hayley Lovitt as Sage
 Joe Nemmers as Ed Weeks
 Jeff Daniel Phillips as Fade
 Jermaine Rivers as Shatter
 Garret Dillahunt as Roderick Campbell
 Elena Satine as Sonya Simonson / Dreamer
 Skyler Samuels as the Frost Sisters

Production

Development
Fox made a put pilot commitment in July 2016 for an X-Men based series, written by Matt Nix. His initial pitch for the series, "Running on Empty with mutants", was met with applause by executives. It was criticized for including too much story in the pilot, but Nix moved some of these ideas to later episodes. By January 2017, Nix hoped to see the season run for 12 or 13 episodes, rather than the traditional 22, while Fox chairman and CEO Gary Newman was expecting a final draft of the pilot script and planned to give a pilot pickup within a few weeks of that; Fox officially ordered the series to pilot at the end of the month, and to series, as The Gifted, in May. In August, Len Wiseman joined as a director and executive producer for the season, which consists of 13 episodes.

Writing
The series is not a procedural, and does not have a "save the mutant of the week" formula, instead following the ongoing story of the mutant underground as they both try to save other mutants and fight to protect themselves. Each episode does still have a beginning, middle, and end, including a flashback at the start of each episode focused on a particular character's history. Where the films and comics generally tell stories starting with the X-Men encountering "the world outside", Nix wanted to approach the story from the perspective of outsiders who are learning about the mutant world. The series also explores issues that reflect modern, real-world problems such as police attempting to kill mutants just because they look different, or the government only taking issue with mutants if they reveal themselves in public. The series' mutant underground is inspired by the Underground Railroad. A major struggle for the central parents of the series is that they are human and their children are mutants, and while they may sympathize with the mutants around them, "there's still a difference between them and the mutants and there's no getting around it". They also have to balance trying to help the cause with protecting their family.

Noting a growing trend in shorter, self-contained television seasons, Nix said in October 2017 that he wanted The Gifted to feel more like a traditional, long-running story and have each season end in a satisfying way that does not feel "close-ended". The season's fourth episode was designed to launch the full story arc, reuniting the main characters following the events of the first three episodes and showing their changed mindsets—the Strucker family gains a new appreciation of the mutant struggle for them to carry forward as they join the fight, while Polaris's time in prison has changed her outlook as well. The episode also reveals that mutants can be turned against each other in an adaptation of the Hound Program from the comics. The story arc of the season builds to a war that the X-Men believed was coming, and the series' characters having to decide how they wish to fight that war. It ends with the mutant Polaris having to decide whether she wants to follow the more extreme views of her father Magneto, or align herself more with the less extreme views of her boyfriend Eclipse. This creates the potential of two groups of mutants fighting each other, rather than uniting against Sentinel Services. Nix acknowledged that the final scene of the season is reminiscent of the end of the film X-Men: First Class, where Magneto recruits mutants for his own, more extreme group, but felt that this was a central theme to the X-Men and "constant throughout this universe. I think certainly we wanted to do our own version of that."

Casting

In February 2017, Blair Redford was cast, later confirmed as John Proudstar / Thunderbird; Jamie Chung was cast as Clarice Fong / Blink, Stephen Moyer was cast as Reed Strucker; and Sean Teale was cast as Marcos Diaz / Eclipse. The next month, Natalie Alyn Lind joined as Lauren Strucker; Amy Acker was cast as Caitlin Strucker; Emma Dumont as Lorna Dane / Polaris; Percy Hynes White as Andy Strucker; and Coby Bell as Jace Turner.

Elena Satine was revealed in August 2017 to have been cast in the series as Dreamer, a mutant who can "add or subtract" others' memories, to first appear in the second episode. In September 2017, Garret Dillahunt joined the series in the "key recurring role" of Roderick Campbell, and Skyler Samuels was revealed to have joined the series as Esme in November, soon said to be another "key recurring role" for the series. Esme was revealed to be one of the Frost siblings, with Samuels also portraying her sisters Phoebe and Sophie. Also appearing throughout the series are Hayley Lovitt, Jeff Daniel Phillips, and Jermaine Rivers as the mutants Sage, Fade, and Shatter, respectively; and Joe Nemmers as Ed Weeks, a Sentinel Services agent.

Design
The costumes for the pilot were designed by Louise Mingenbach, costume designer for several of the X-Men films. She worked to incorporate the mutant characters' abilities into their costumes, such as adding metallic elements to Polaris's costume like rings that she can use as weapons and steel-toed boots that she can use to levitate. Cameron Dale took over from Mingenbach for the rest of the season. For Dale, the most important aspect of the series' costumes was making them appear grounded and realistic for a refugee/on-the-run setting. This meant using clothing that would logically be worn in real life, such as typical clothes for teenagers to wear to high school, and then repeating elements throughout the season to show the characters having a limited set of clothes that gets aged the more they wear them.

Filming
Singer, the director of several of the X-Men films, decided to direct the series' pilot episode himself after a change in schedule for a film he was directing. He stressed that "tonally and visually it will be very, very different" from the films, and said that there will be "some stuff go down, visually, but at its heart it is a story about a family". Singer began prepping for production on January 27, 2017. Filming for the pilot, under the working title Heaven, began on March 13, 2017, in Dallas, Texas, and was completed by April 11. Some reshoots for the pilot had also been carried out by the end of that month.

In May 2017, the Dallas Film Commission announced that the rest of The Gifteds episodes would not be filmed in the city. The series' production had put off the decision as long as they could, waiting for a decision on tax rebates in the state to be made by the Texas Legislature, but ultimately ran out of time and chose to film the rest of the series elsewhere. At the start of July, filming was revealed to be resuming in Atlanta, Georgia, beginning July 17. On filming in the state, Dumont stated, "We love filming in Georgia, because it was such a big part of the civil rights movement in the United States." Because of this move, the series' setting was changed from Dallas to Atlanta (with the pilot episode retroactively changed to match this). Filming in Atlanta takes place at Atlanta Metro Studios, on a filming schedule of eight or nine days per episode, though more time was allocated to the filming of the second episode, which Nix felt was a "bigger" episode than the others.

Shared universe connections
Nix noted in July 2017 that the film X-Men: Days of Future Past established multiple, different timelines or "streams" in the X-Men universe, and that the series would take advantage of those to avoid the films and comics and instead do "our own thing". He explained that in the series' "stream", the X-Men have disappeared, due to a "bit of a 9/11 event, that caused enormous social upheaval and a lot of hatred towards mutants." Nix later elaborated that it was a "necessity ... to stay out of the way of the movies" but he felt this worked as a "virtue" for the series, such as not mentioning Magneto by name to avoid the films, but still referencing the character in a way that makes it "a feature of the characters that they don’t really want to talk about" him, similar to Voldemort. Alternate versions of elements from the films appear in the season, including Sentinels, mutant-hunting robots that appeared in several of the films, and the company Trask Industries. To avoid clashing with the version of Bolivar Trask portrayed by Peter Dinklage in Days of Future Past, the writers chose not to include or mention that character at all and instead introduced the character of Roderick Campbell as the leader of the organization.

Release

Broadcast
The season began airing in the United States on Fox on October 2, 2017, and ran for 13 episodes, concluding with a 2-hour season finale on January 15, 2018. It was broadcast in Canada on CTV, and in more than 183 countries on Fox, following its U.S. debut, using a "day-and-date launch" format.

Marketing
With the official series order, Fox released a brief teaser for the series which /Film's Jacob Hall described as "bland", particularly "arriving in the wake of Logan, Deadpool, and FX's Legion, each of which proved that there's plenty of gas in the tank for Mutantkind, provided that everyone involved is willing to really shake things up and go for broke." This was followed a week later by a full length trailer for Fox's May 2017 Upfront presentation, which Hoai-Tran Bui, also of /Film, said "looks like a Singer take on Heroes." Bui added, "The Gifted is a bit more by-the-numbers [than Legion], airing on a primetime network, spearheaded by X-Men movie director Singer, and clearly connected to the movie universe ... Whether that connection helps or hinders the series is yet to be seen—as is Singer's involvement, whose X-Men films become increasingly nonsensical and…bad." The trailer had been viewed over 31 million times within a day of its release, including over 11 million views on YouTube. This was compared to the performance of the first trailer for This Is Us the year before, which went on to be a critical and commercial success. Also for Fox's Upfront, "government agents" from the series' Sentinel Services agency were running a mobile "Mutant Testing Center" in New York City on May 15, offering genetic tests to see if participants have the "mutant gene". The test results "about who they are and where they came from" would be mailed to the participants in about a month. Footage from the pilot was screened at a 2017 San Diego Comic-Con panel featuring cast and crew members, and the beginning of the second episode was debuted at a similar panel for the show at New York Comic Con later that year.

Reception

Ratings

The series debuted higher than the season premiere of Lucifer in the same timeslot the year before, became a "solid ratings performer" for Fox, ranking the third best new drama series of the season, leading to a second season renewal.

Critical response
The review aggregator website Rotten Tomatoes reported a 74% approval rating, with an average rating of 6.67/10 based on 50 reviews. The website's consensus states, "The Gifteds first season lays a solid foundation for an involving superhero drama that powers past the origin-story doldrums by focusing on grounded, topical stories over mindless action and special effects." Metacritic, which uses a weighted average, assigned a score of 63 out of 100 based on 22 reviews, indicating "generally favorable reviews".

Giving his first impression of the series' pilot for TVLine, Matt Webb Mitovich praised the "instantly engaging premise" and visual effects. He felt the entire cast was "solid", which he called "no easy feat with an ensemble this size", and also highlighted the clear establishment of the characters' relationships. He concluded by noting that the series would be facing tough opposition in terms of ratings, but that there was a chance for the show to be more successful than Gotham (which it replaced in Fox's airing schedule). Also reviewing the first episode, Dominic Patten of Deadline Hollywood praised the series as being superior to Marvel's Inhumans, and particularly noted its high stakes and timely themes. He did feel that there were elements in the episode that were derivative of Heroes, but ultimately summed up the episode as "quite good".

Daniel Fienberg from The Hollywood Reporter wrote, "The Gifted gets points for including X-Men characters with some name recognition and for acknowledging its place within the bigger franchise. That, however, raises expectations, too, as does Singer's adroit work with a budget that no subsequent director is likely to have. Three or four effects-driven set pieces ... balance out the soapy family moments. I have very little confidence that The Gifted will be able to achieve that balance in subsequent episodes, but I'll definitely be watching to find out". Joshua Yehl of IGN felt the pilot "delivers everything you'd expect from a show based in the world of the X-Men ... It may not be as thought-provoking as Legion, but it doesn't try to be." Yehl thought the best element of the series was how it "sets up a 'normal' family where the father makes a living off of sending mutants to jail and the son casually tosses out a mutant slur at the dinner table, and then forces those same people to rely on mutants to survive".

Comparison to Nazism
Discussing the series, Drew Koch of Bustle magazine noted that it explored themes such as the persecution of minority groups, sacrificing freedom for safety, and criticizing "big government". He highlighted the antagonistic agency Sentinel Services, feeling that giving it the initials "SS" was a reference to the Schutzstaffel, a paramilitary division of Nazi Germany. USA Today's Brian Truitt also noted this reference, and the character Polaris directly calling out the government agents as Nazis, along with the mutant underground being patterned after the Underground Railroad.

References

External links

2017 American television seasons
2018 American television seasons
01